The  is a railway line operated by the East Japan Railway Company (JR East) adjacent to Tokyo Bay, paralleling the western (i.e., inner) shore of the Bōsō Peninsula. It connects Soga Station in the city of Chiba to Awa-Kamogawa Station in the city of Kamogawa, passing through the municipalities of Chiba, Ichihara, Sodegaura, Kisarazu, Kimitsu, Futtsu, Kyonan, Tateyama, and Minamibōsō. The line is connected at both ends to the Sotobō Line. The name of the Uchibō Line in the Japanese language is formed from two kanji characters. The first, means "inner" and the second,  is the first character of the Bōsō. The name of the line thus refers to its location along the inner part of the Bōsō Peninsula in relation to the Tokyo Metropolitan Area, as opposed to the Sotobō Line, "outer Bōsō" which is on the opposite side of the peninsula. South of Kimitsu is single track, and north of Kimitsu is double track.

Station list
Legend
 ● : All trains stop
 | : All trains pass

 Notes
 Local trains stop at every station.
 See Limited Express Sazanami article also.

Note: Special Rapid services were discontinued from 4 March 2017.

Operation
The Uchibō Line operates local service with trains generally originating and terminating at Chiba Station. Trains headed directly for Tokyo Station merge with the Sotobō Line between Soga and Chiba Stations, and with the Sōbu Main Line between Chiba and Tokyo, while express and commuter trains merge with the Keiyō Line from Soga station.

Local trains

Keiyō Line through service
In the morning, there are three inbound Rapid and Commuter Rapid trains, and in the evening, there are five outbound Rapid and Commuter Rapid trains and two inbound Local trains. On weekends and holidays, Rapid trains replace the Commuter Rapid trains.

Yokosuka Line—Sōbu Line Rapid through service

Trains leaving north from  connect directly to the Sōbu Line (Rapid), with some continuing onto the Yokosuka Line. Since the October 2004 timetable revision, all trains now stop at Nagaura and Sodegaura stations.

Limited express trains

The limited express train Sazanami runs from Tokyo Station to Kimitsu (and Tateyama station during busy periods). The limited express View Sazanami formerly ran on the Uchibō Line as well, but it was merged with the Sazanami following the timetable revision on December 10, 2005.

Rolling stock
Local service
 E131 series 2-car EMUs (since 13 March 2021)
 209-2000/2100 series 4/6-car EMUs (since 1 October 2009)

Keiyō Line through service
 209-500 series 10-car EMUs
 E233-5000 series 10-car EMUs

Yokosuka Line—Sōbu Line Rapid through service
 E217 series 11+4-car EMUs with 2 green cars
 E235-1000 series 11+4-car EMUs with 2 green cars

 Sazanami and Shinjuku Sazanami Limited Express
 255 series EMUs with 1 green car
 E257-500 series EMUs

History

It operated from Soga Station to Anegasaki Station in Ichihara. Several extensions were built over the next few years, and in 1919 it reached Awa-Hōjō (present day Tateyama). By 1925 it had been extended to its present-day terminus, Awa-Kamogawa Station.

In 1929, the Hōjō Line was incorporated into the Bōsō Line.

The Soga - Kimitsu section was duplicated between 1964 and 1971, and the entire line was electrified between 1968 and 1971. Individual section dates as given in the Timeline section below.

Timeline
March 28, 1912 – Kisarazu Line (Soga to Anegasaki) begins operation
August 21, 1912 – Extended from Anegasaki to Kisarazu
January 15, 1915 – Extended from Kisarazu to Kazusa-Minato
October 11, 1916 – Extended from Kazusa-Minato to Hamakanaya
August 1, 1917 – Extended from Hamakanaya to Awa-Katsuyama
August 10, 1918 – Extended from Awa-Katsuyama to Nako-Funakata
May 24, 1919 – Extended from Nako-Funakata to Awa-Hōjō; renamed Hōjō Line
June 1, 1921 – Extended from Awa-Hōjō to Minamihara
December 20, 1922 – Extended from Minamihara to Emi
July 25, 1924 – Extended from Emi to Futomi
July 11, 1925 – Extended from Futomi to Awa-Kamogawa
June 16, 1926 – Takeoka station opened
May 20, 1927 – Chitose railyard opened
August 15, 1929 – Bōsō line extended to Awa-Kamogawa; Hōjō Line incorporated into Bōsō Line
August 1, 1930 – Chitose railyard is upgraded to a station
April 1, 1933 – Bōsō line from Soga to Awa-Kamogawa (the run of the former Hōjō Line) is renamed Bōsō West Line
November 20, 1941 – Iwane station opened
March 1, 1946 – Awa-Hōjō station renamed Tateyama Station
January 10, 1947 – Nagaura station opened
April 10, 1956 – Shūsai station renamed Kimitsu Station
July 1, 1964 – Double-track section built between Soga and Hamano
September 20, 1964 – Double track extended from Hamano to Yawatajuku
July 4, 1965 – Double track extended from Yawatajuku to Goi
May 26, 1968 – Double track extended from Goi to Nagaura
July 13, 1968 – Electric wires extended from Chiba station, past Sogo, extending to Kisarazu
March 20, 1969 – Double track extended from Nagaura to Naraba
July 10, 1969 – 135 C57-105 steam engines removed from service
July 11, 1969 – Electric wires extended from Kisarazu to Chikura
March 18, 1970 – Double track extended from Naraba to Kisarazu
March 24, 1970 – Double track extended from Kisarazu to Kimitsu
July 1, 1971 – Electric wires extended from Chikura to Awa-Kamogawa
July 15, 1972 – Renamed Uchibō Line
March 31, 1974 – Naraba station renamed Sodegaura
November 15, 1982 – Freight service between Kisarazu and Awa-Kamogawa discontinued
April 1, 1987 – Acquired by East Japan Railway Company following the division and privatization of  JNR initiated by prime minister Yasuhiro Nakasone; Japan Freight Railway Company becomes a second class railway enterprise between Soga and Kisarazu
November 1, 1996 – Japan Freight Railway Company second class enterprise between Soga and Kisarazu is discontinued
February 4, 2001 – ATS-P usage implemented between Chiba and Iwane
October 1, 2009 - 209-2000/2100 series EMUs are introduced on local services
March 13, 2021 - E131 series EMUs are introduced on local services between Kisarazu and Awa-Kamogawa, replacing most 209-2000/2100 series trains in that section

References

 
Lines of East Japan Railway Company
Railway lines in Chiba Prefecture
1067 mm gauge railways in Japan
Railway lines opened in 1912
1912 establishments in Japan